Coleophora plicipunctella is a moth of the family Coleophoridae. It is found in Spain and China.

References

plicipunctella
Moths described in 1915
Moths of Europe
Moths of Asia